A billing and settlement plan (BSP) (also known as "Bank Settlement Plan") business process is an electronic billing system designed to facilitate the flow of data and funds between travel agencies and airlines.  The advantage of such an intermediary organization is that instead of each travel agency having an individual relationship with each airline, all of the information is consolidated through the BSP.

BSP's are organized on a local basis, usually one per country.  However, there are some BSP's, which cover more than one country (for example, the Nordics).  The International Air Transport Association states that at the close of 2009, there were 86 BSP's covering more than 160 countries worldwide, while at the close of 2011, there were 88 BSPs, covering 176 countries and territories serving about 400 airlines, with gross sales processed amounting to USD 249 billion.

Travel agents are usually required to be accredited by either Airlines Reporting Corporation (ARC), when they are located in the US, or BSP outside of the US, in order to issue airline reservations through GDS.

References

Airline tickets
International Air Transport Association
Transport law
Payment systems